Ann Kobayashi (born April 10, 1937) is an American politician and businesswoman from Honolulu, Hawaii. She is a member of the Honolulu City Council, representing District 5 since 2009. She previously held the same City Council seat between 2002 and 2008, but resigned from the seat to unsuccessfully run for Mayor of Honolulu against incumbent Mufi Hannemann. She was also a member of the Hawaii Senate between 1981 and 1994.

Personal life 
Ann Kobayashi was born April 10, 1937, in Honolulu to Mori and Florence Hayashi. She grew up with her brother Roy Hayashi near Punchbowl Crater, later moving with her family to Nu‘uanu Valley.

Kobayashi graduated from President Theodore Roosevelt High School before attending Pembroke College in Brown University and Northwestern University.

She was married to Paul Kobayashi until their divorce, and has three children.

Political career 
From 1981 to 1994, Kobayashi represented the Manoa area in the Hawaii Senate. During that time, she was chairwoman of the State Senate's Ways and Means Committee for two years. In 1994, Kobayashi ran for Mayor of Honolulu but lost. In 1997, she was the Executive Assistant to Mayor Jeremy Harris, and from 1997 to 2002 she worked in the State Executive office as a Special Assistant to Governor Ben Cayetano.

In 2002, Kobayashi successfully ran for Honolulu City Council District 5. She gave up her council seat in 2008 when she again ran for Mayor of Honolulu. She lost the election, and her council seat was won by Duke Bainum, who ran unopposed. Bainum, however, died on June 9, 2009, leaving the council seat vacant. The special election that was held resulted in Kobayashi being declared the winner on August 8 with more than 37 percent of the vote.

References

External links 

Oral history interview

1937 births
American women of Japanese descent in politics
Hawaii Democrats
Hawaii politicians of Japanese descent
Hawaii Republicans
Hawaii state senators
Honolulu City Council members
Living people
Women state legislators in Hawaii
Women city councillors in Hawaii
President Theodore Roosevelt High School alumni
Asian-American city council members
21st-century American politicians
21st-century American women politicians